Secunderabad Lok Sabha constituency is one of the 17 Lok Sabha (Lower House of the Parliament) constituencies in Telangana state in southern India.

Assembly segments
Secunderabad Lok Sabha constituency comprises the following Legislative Assembly segments:

Secunderabad Lok Sabha constituency Delimitation History  
Following Assembly constituencies were included in Secunderabad constituency during delimitation every time.

Members of Lok Sabha

^ by-poll

Election results

General Election, 2019

General Election, 2014

General Election, 2009

General Election, 2004

See also
 Secunderabad
 List of Constituencies of the Lok Sabha

References

External links
 Secunderabad lok sabha  constituency election 2019 date and schedule

Lok Sabha constituencies in Telangana
Hyderabad district, India
Politics of Hyderabad, India
Politics of Secunderabad